Dargai (in Urdu: درگئی) (in Pashto: درګئی) is a Union council in Charsadda District of Khyber-Pakhtunkhwa.
Dargai is the last Union Council of Charsadda District on Mardan Road Near Manga. Which is located on Mardan Road at the distance of 16 kilometers from Charsadda city.
Dargai is also Known as "Dargai Manga"

References
near to manga Mardan

Union councils of Charsadda District
Populated places in Charsadda District, Pakistan